The 35th Golden Raspberry Awards, or Razzies, was an awards ceremony that honored the worst films the film industry had to offer in 2014. The Golden Raspberry Awards, also known as Razzies, are awarded based on votes from members of the Golden Raspberry Foundation. The pre-nomination ballot was revealed on December 31, 2014, and final nominations were revealed on January 14, 2015. The winners were announced on February 21, 2015 at a ceremony that was open to the public for the first time in the award's history.

Winners and nominees

Films with multiple nominations
The following eleven films received multiple nominations:

Films with multiple wins
The following two films received multiple awards:

References

External links
 

Golden Raspberry Awards ceremonies
Golden Raspberry
Golden Raspberry
2015 in American cinema
February 2015 events in the United States
Golden Raspberry
Events in Los Angeles